Loudoun Country Day School (LCDS) is an accredited, independent, coeducational pre-school through eighth-grade school located in Leesburg, Virginia.

History
The school was founded in 1953 by Mrs. William J. McDonald and Mrs. J. Churchill Newcomb and after a few years found a home at 237 Fairview Street, NW. As of July, 2009, the school relocated to a new campus at 20600 Red Cedar Drive.

The head of school is Dr. Randall Hollister, who was the recipient of the 2002 Washington Post Private School Distinguished Leadership Award in Education, and who has been head of the school since 1993.

The school is accredited by the Association of Independent Schools and is a member of the National Association of Independent Schools (NAIS) and the Association of Independent Schools of Greater Washington (AISGW).

Campus
In July, 2009, LCDS relocated to a newly constructed  campus also located in Leesburg.

Curriculum
LCDS offers a core curriculum and extensive programs in foreign languages, arts, music (including a string orchestra starting in fourth grade), STEM Lab, library, and athletics.

Extracurricular activities
LCDS's after school activities include a variety of academic, arts and sports-related classes. 
LCDS conducts a variety of summer enrichment camps and partners with third-party vendors to offer additional camp opportunities on school's campus. 
Middle school students participate in competitive girls' field hockey, boys' soccer, basketball, lacrosse and tennis. 
LCDS is a member of the Piedmont Athletic Conference (PAC). Member schools include: Highland School, Powhatan School, Wakefield School, The Hill School and Loudoun Country Day School.

Notable alumni, faculty and staff 
 Keslie Tomlinson (1995) - Skeleton Athlete, 2010 Winter Olympics in Vancouver, Canada 
 Madeleine Haeringer (1989) - Journalist with NBC. See MSNBC news article Behind the Scenes: Reporting from Afghanistan
Tiffany Taylor (1987)- Model and Actress ``
 James McMurtry (1979) - Singer and songwriter
Alex Aust (2005) - Women's Lacrosse

References

External links
 Loudoun Country Day School

Educational institutions established in 1953
Schools in Loudoun County, Virginia
Private middle schools in Virginia
Private elementary schools in Virginia
Private K–8 schools in the United States
1953 establishments in Virginia
Leesburg, Virginia